The Eastbourne Group of Contemporary Artists is an artists' exhibiting society based in Eastbourne, Sussex for professional and semi-professional artists.

History 

The group was founded in 1913 as the Eastbourne Society of Artists, changing to the Eastbourne Group in 1968 and The Eastbourne Group of Contemporary Artists in 2003. The first Chairman of the group was Arthur Reeve-Fowkes A.R.C.A (1881-1965), who was also the Towner Art Gallery's first curator.

Notable Past Members 

Arthur Reeve-Fowkes, A.R.C.A (1881-1965)
Bertram Nicholls, P.R.B.A (1883-1974)
Leslie Charlotte Benenson, R.E. (b. 1941)
Helen Moggridge, F.F.P.S
Dino (Leopoldo) Mazzoli
Carola Richards (1916-2004)
June Hainault

Notes

References 
Art and Artists (Published by Hansom Books, 1973)
Dolman, B. Who's Who in Art (Twenty-Second Edition, 1986)
Baile de Laperriere, C. Who's Who in Art (31st Edition, 2004)
Windsor, A. British Sculptors of the Twentieth Century (Published by Ashgate, 2002)
Osborne, A. On View: A Guide to Museum and Gallery Acquisitions in Great Britain (Plaistow Publications, 1969)
The Year's Art (Published by J.S. Virture & Co., Ltd., 1941)
Information File - National Art Library, London.

English art
English artist groups and collectives